South Whidbey State Park is a public recreation area consisting of  of old-growth forest and tidelands with  of shoreline on Admiralty Inlet along the west shore of Whidbey Island in Island County, Washington. The state park contains many mature specimens of western red cedar, Douglas fir, Sitka spruce, and western hemlock, some of the largest on Whidbey island, including a giant cedar over 500 years old.

History 
When the park was created in 1974 it consisted of approximately 87 acres of shoreline along Puget Sound. In 1977 local citizens filed a lawsuit against the Washington Department of Natural Resources, which managed the park, when they learned that the state agency planned to grant logging contracts on an adjacent 267 acre parcel of land known as "Classic U," which contained one of the few remaining stands of old-growth conifers on the island. Activists pursued legal solutions to prevent logging of the parcel, forming a nonprofit foundation called Save the Trees and seeking a temporary injunction on logging from the state government. Many also practiced civil disobedience—laying down in front of bulldozers to prevent the destruction of ancient trees.

After many years of negotiation and litigation, 255 acres of the Classic U parcel were officially added to the state park system by action of the legislature. In 1992, the parcel was officially purchased from the DNR and added to South Whidbey State Park.

In 2006 an additional 7.3 acre parcel was added to South Whidbey State Park, bringing the total acreage to 347. This land, known as the "Ryan addition" in honor of local conservationists Al and Maureen Ryan, who were instrumental in the battle to preserve the Classic U groves from logging, was purchased with funds contributed by the state Parks and Recreation Commission, the Island County Commission, and private donors in an effort organized by the non-profit Whidbey Camano Land Trust.

In 2015 the campground and overnight use of the park closed indefinitely due to dangerous conditions from “advanced levels of heart rot in the stems of large old-growth trees.”

Amenities 

References

External links

South Whidbey State Park Washington State Parks and Recreation Commission

State parks of Washington (state)
Parks in Island County, Washington
Protected areas established in 1963
Old-growth forests